The North Korean ambassador to East Germany in East Berlin was the official representative of the Government in Pyongyang to the Government of East Germany. Until 1979, the address of the embassy was Sundelfinger Straße 38 in Berlin-Karlshorst.

List of representatives

See also
Germany–North Korea relations
List of ambassadors of North Korea to Germany

References 

Germany East
Korea North